The Muscoot Reservoir is a reservoir in the New York City water supply system in northern Westchester County, New York, located directly north of the village of Katonah.  Part of the system's Croton Watershed, it is 25 miles (40 kilometres) north of the City.

History
The reservoir was constructed at the beginning of the 20th century. It was formed by impounding both the Muscoot River, a tributary of the Croton River, and the Croton River proper, a tributary of the Hudson River.  Empounded water from the New Croton Reservoir flows through the New Croton Aqueduct into the Bronx for distribution in New York City.

The reservoir was completed in 1905.

During construction, the New York Central Railroad moved Bridge L-158 from the Rondout Creek near Kingston to carry its Mahopac Branch across a section of the reservoir near Goldens Bridge. It remains today although service on the branch ended in 1960.

In 1978, Bridge L-158 was listed on the National Register of Historic Places as the only remaining double-intersection Whipple truss railroad bridge in the state.

Geography
The reservoir was once much smaller, but the other side of the original dam was intentionally flooded to make the reservoir bigger, when a new dam was built downstream. The original dam is still standing, and divides the reservoir in two.

The reservoir serves as the first main collecting point for all the reservoirs in the Croton Watershed.

Water from the Muscoot Reservoir flows into the New Croton Reservoir.  From there it enters the New Croton Aqueduct and flows south into the Jerome Park Reservoir in The Bronx. Water from the Croton Aqueduct is distributed within the city to parts of The Bronx, Manhattan, and western Queens.

Fish species found in the reservoir include largemouth bass, smallmouth bass, brown bullhead, common carp, black crappie, yellow perch, chain pickerel, sunfish, brown trout, and rainbow trout.

See also

List of reservoirs and dams in New York

References

External links
Photos of the Muscoot Reservoir and historic Bridge L-158

Reservoirs in Westchester County, New York
Croton Watershed
Reservoirs in New York (state)
Protected areas of Westchester County, New York
Somers, New York